Franck Iacono (born June 14, 1966 in Antibes, Alpes-Maritimes) is a retired freestyle swimmer from France. He competed at two consecutive Summer Olympics for his native country, starting in 1984. He was affiliated with the University of Alabama (1984).

References

1966 births
Living people
People from Antibes
French male freestyle swimmers
Olympic swimmers of France
Swimmers at the 1984 Summer Olympics
Swimmers at the 1988 Summer Olympics
University of Alabama alumni
Sportspeople from Alpes-Maritimes
20th-century French people